Lobariella sandwicensis is a species of foliose lichen in the family Peltigeraceae. Found in Hawaii, it was formally described as a new species in 2017 by lichenologists Robert Lücking  Bibiana Moncada and Clifford Smith. It is the most common species of Lobariella in Hawaii, and has been recorded from mesic habitats in mountainous forests on the islands of Kauai, Maui, and Oahu, but not from Hawaii. The specific epithet refers to the Sandwich Islands, a historical name for Hawaii.

References

Peltigerales
Lichen species
Lichens described in 2017
Lichens of Hawaii
Taxa named by Robert Lücking
Fungi without expected TNC conservation status